Syed Manzur Elahi is a Bangladeshi businessperson and chairman of Apex group.

Early life 
Elahi's father Sir Syed Nasim Ali was the Chief Justice of the undivided Bengal in 1946.

Elahi received his B.A. from St. Xavier's College, Kolkata. He earned his master's degree from the University of Dhaka in Economics. He founded and is the chairman of Holiday Publications Limited. He moved to Dhaka in 1962 from Kolkata. In 1972, he resigned from his job and started working as an agent for a French leather importer. In 1975, the Bangladesh government started to privatize companies that were nationalised. He bought one such company, Orient Tannery, in Hazaribag, Dhaka for 1.2 million taka.

Career 
Elahi ventured into the business world on his 30th birthday after a 7-year tenure at British American Tobacco. He is the chairman of Apex group. He is an administrator of Federation of Bangladesh Chambers of Commerce and Industry. He is a former advisor to the Caretaker Government of Bangladesh. He is the chairman of the Trustee board of East West University. In 2008, he was the president of Dhaka University Alumni Association. He held a term as the chairman of Pioneer Insurance Company Limited. He is the chairman of Bangladesh Freedom Foundation.

Personal life 
Elahi was married to Niloufer Manzur. She had founded Sunbeams School in Bangladesh. Both of them contracted COVID-19 in 2020. Niloufer died on 26 May 2020.

References 

Living people
University of Calcutta alumni
Advisors of Caretaker Government of Bangladesh
Place of birth missing (living people)
Date of birth missing (living people)
Year of birth missing (living people)